Una storia d'amore is a 1969 Italian film directed by Michele Lupo featuring soprano Anna Moffo.

References

1969 films
1960s Italian films